Bills Creek is a stream in the U.S. state of West Virginia. It is a tributary of Sugar Creek.

Bills Creek derives its name from William Barker, a local pioneer.

See also
List of rivers of West Virginia

References

Rivers of Barbour County, West Virginia
Rivers of West Virginia